This is a list of museums in Orange County, California, defined for this context as institutions (including nonprofit organizations, government entities, and private businesses) that collect and care for objects of cultural, artistic, scientific, or historical interest and make their collections or related exhibits available for public viewing. Also included are non-profit and university art galleries. Museums that exist only in cyberspace (i.e., virtual museums) are not included.

To use the sortable tables: click on the icons at the top of each column to sort that column in alphabetical order; click again for reverse alphabetical order.

Museums

See also
List of museums in California

Defunct museums
 Briggs Cunningham Museum, an automotive museum in Costa Mesa, closed in 1986
 Movieland Wax Museum, Buena Park
 Newport Sports Museum, Newport Beach, closed in 2014

References

External links
 California State Association of Counties (CSAC)

Orange